Sphenopsalis is a genus of extinct mammal from the Paleocene of Central Asia. It was a member of the extinct order Multituberculata, and lies within the suborder Cimolodonta and the superfamily Taeniolabidoidea. The genus was named by William Diller Matthew, W. Granger and George Gaylord Simpson in 1928.

The one known species, Sphenopsalis nobilis, was also named by Matthew, Granger and Simpson in 1928. It was found in the Late Paleocene Nomogen and Khashat Formations of Mongolia and China. The American Museum of Natural History in New York City has a specimen in its collection.

References

Further reading 
 Matthew, et al. (1928), "Paleocene Multituberculates from Mongolia". Am. Museum Novitates 331, p. 1-4.
 Kielan-Jaworowska Z. and Hurum J.H. (2001), "Phylogeny and Systematics of Multituberculate Mammals". Paleontology 44, p. 389-429.
 Much of this information is derived from  MESOZOIC MAMMALS: Eucosmodontidae, Microcosmodontidae and Taeniolabidoidea, an Internet directory

Cimolodonts
Paleocene mammals
Paleocene genus extinctions
Paleogene mammals of Asia
Prehistoric mammal genera